Snehal Bhatkar (real name Vasudev Gangaram Bhatkar, B. Vasudev; 17 July 1919–29 May 2007), was a well known Hindi and Marathi film music composer from Mumbai, India. He is the recipient of Lata Mangeshkar Award instituted by Government of Maharashtra of year 2004.

Early life
Snehal Bhatkar was born on 17 July 1919 in Mumbai in a Marathi-speaking family. His father died when he was 18 months old. His mother was a teacher and was a singer as well. It was from her that he picked up the basics of music. After completing matriculation he learned music at a music school in Dadar.  He died at his Mumbai residence on 29 May 2007 at the age of 87 years.

Pseudonym
To avoid any breach in contract while officially working for HMV, he adopted various pseudonyms as a composer. These included "B. Vasudev" and "Snehal" but another choice, "Snehal Bhatkar", became fixed. The name was derived from that of his then newly born daughter, Snehlata.

Career
He made started his movie career with the movie Neel Kamal in the year 1947. Bhatkar and lyricist Kidar Nath Sharma had shared a special bond, teaming up for hit songs like Kabhi Tanhaiyon Mein (Hamari Yaad Aayegi) which may be regarded as the zenith of Bhatkar's career.

Personal life
His three children include noted Marathi actor Ramesh Bhatkar, Avinash Bhatkar and daughter Snehlata Bhatkar (now married to Ramkrishna Barde).

Music Director

External links

References

Hindi film score composers
Music directors
1919 births
2007 deaths